Terence Martin "Terry" McFlynn (born 27 March 1981) is a retired footballer from Northern Ireland who is most well known for playing for the A-League club Sydney FC. He is currently serving as the W-League and Academy manager for Perth Glory FC.

Early life
McFlynn grew up in Swatragh, in Northern Ireland to a Catholic family. He played Gaelic Football for the first sixteen years of his life, one of Ireland's traditional sports, before he switched to football on advice from his uncle.

Club career
McFlynn began his footballing career in England as an apprentice at Queens Park Rangers in 1996. McFlynn made only two first-team appearances in his five-year stay at the club – his first-team debut was made on 28 April 2001. He was released in 2001 and signed for Woking. McFlynn made 10 appearances for the West Surrey club scoring only once, in a short half-year deal.

McFlynn moved to Margate, initially on a one-month loan deal, but ended up being a useful three-year career, in November 2001. McFlynn quickly became a huge favourite with the Margate fans, helped by a stunning debut goal against Boston United. He made 63 appearances for the club and scoring a total of 11 goals. A hamstring injury late in 2002 saw McFlynn miss several key games and as a result was sold to Morecambe.

In 2003, McFlynn moved to Conference rivals Morecambe for £14,000 and, despite scoring on debut, he was unable to cement a spot in the team and was released in 2005, but made 35 appearances and scoring five goals in just 17 games.

Sydney FC
Following the advice of former teammate and one-time New Zealand captain Chris Zoricich, McFlynn moved to Australia to play in the newly formed A-League and was signed by Sydney FC manager Pierre Littbarski after a successful trial in February 2005.

In his first season with Sydney FC, McFlynn made 21 appearances and proved to be a strong and determined player. He scored a memorable first goal for the club in round five of the 2005–06 season against the Queensland Roar in which he lobbed their goalkeeper, Tom Willis, from 30 meters out to round off a 3–1 victory to Sydney FC.

Sydney FC progressed to the inaugural A-League Grand Final, which was played at the Sydney Football Stadium on 5 March 2006. McFlynn played the full 90 minutes as Sydney FC defeated the Central Coast Mariners 1–0 in front of 41,689 spectators to become the inaugural A-League champions.

He failed to make an impact on the 2006–07 A-League season when he picked up a hamstring injury and as a result, only making 13 appearances, without scoring.

In the 2007–08 season he scored two more goals. One against Central Coast Mariners, in Sydney's 5–4 win and against Wellington Phoenix which Sydney won 2–0. Both of these goals were in the latter half of the season. 

In February 2008 McFlynn signed a new contract with Sydney for a further two years. He scored his fourth goal in Sydney's fifth match in the A-League 2008-09, against Adelaide United in Sydney's 3–0 victory, with a volley from outside the box. Another goal for Sydney against F3 Freeway rivals Central Coast Mariners took his tally to five. In a match against Adelaide United at Hindmarsh Stadium in which he was given a straight red card he sustained five-week knee injury. However, he returned to the bench in the third game of the season against Adelaide United in their 2–0 loss at the Adelaide Oval. His sixth goal for the club came against rivals Central Coast Mariners, scoring the only goal in their 1–0 victory. Speaking after the game McFlynn said it was his most memorable, as his first child had been born the week before, not to mention it was his first game after returning from a thigh injury.

In November 2009, Sydney FC held a press conference to inform the public that they had re-signed McFlynn on a further three-year contract, up until 2013. This will mean by the end of this contract, McFlynn will have been with the club for eight years. McFlynn further commented saying

I don't want to play football for any other clubs, either in Australia or anywhere else," he said "I've been at Sydney FC for five years and I couldn't be happier to be signing on for another three years.

"I have grown to love the club, my family is here and I see Sydney as my home."

On 26 February 2010 it was announced that he had received permanent Australian residency, and hoped to gain Australian citizenship.

One of his greatest honours was standing in as captain for the Grand final as Steve Corica and John Aloisi were injured. He was officially awarded the captaincy for the 2010–11 season on 22 July.

His 100th A-League game for Sydney FC came in Round 3 of the A-League 2010-11 season, with Sydney losing 1–0 to Brisbane Roar at Suncorp Stadium.

McFlynn led Sydney FC into their first game of the AFC Champions League against K-League club Suwon Samsung Bluewings FC. However his role would end after just 32 minutes when he was sent off for stomping on Korean player Lee Sang-ho. After a two-match suspension, he returned to the senior team to help lead Sydney FC to a 3–2 victory over Shanghai Shenhua in Shanghai.

After captaining Sydney to the 2011–12 A-League finals, McFlynn made his 150th appearance in the semi-final against Wellington Phoenix at Westpac Stadium, although Wellington defeated Sydney 3–2 and knocked them out of the finals in the process.

On 6 April 2014, McFlynn announced he would leave Sydney FC and retire from A-League football.

Bonnyrigg White Eagles

McFlynn joined reigning NSW Premier League Champions Bonnyrigg White Eagles making his debut on 11 May 2014 in a round nine clash against Blacktown City Demons.

Club career statistics

International career 
McFlynn has played for the Northern Ireland Under-19 squad and the Northern Ireland Under-21 squad.

Honours 
With Sydney FC:
 A-League Premiership: 2009–2010
 A-League Championship: 2005–2006, 2009–2010
 Oceania Club Championship: 2004–2005

References

External links
 Sydney FC profile

1981 births
Association footballers from Northern Ireland
Queens Park Rangers F.C. players
Woking F.C. players
Morecambe F.C. players
Margate F.C. players
Sydney FC players
English Football League players
National League (English football) players
A-League Men players
Expatriate soccer players in Australia
Expatriate association footballers from Northern Ireland
People from Magherafelt
Living people
Bonnyrigg White Eagles FC players
Naturalised soccer players of Australia
Association football midfielders